The New York Farm Winery Act of 1976 is a law that allows grape growers in New York to establish wineries and sell directly to the public, subject to a maximum of  annually.

In the early 1970s, John Miller, of Benmarl Winery, and John Dyson, commissioner of agriculture, put together a plan to help revitalize the New York wine industry, which was floundering at the time. Governor Hugh Carey signed the plan into law in 1976. The law allowed small grower-producers to sell directly to consumers, as well as reducing certain fees and providing tax and marketing advantages. Originally, the law required farm wineries to sell only estate-grown wines, but it was amended in 1978 to allow the use of any New York-grown grapes in wine sold at a farm winery.

References

New York (state) statutes
Alcohol law in the United States
1976 in law
1976 in New York (state)
Controlled substances in New York (state)
Wineries in New York (state)